Everybody Jam! is the second major label (and third overall) studio album by Scatman John. The album continues along the thematic lines of the first album but with an evolved sound, and cemented his popularity in Japan, released there with five bonus tracks.

The album released two international singles: the title track tribute to Louis Armstrong and "Let It Go", both of which were successful. Additionally, the Japanese bonus tracks "Pripri Scat" and "Su Su Su Super Ki Re i" charted successfully there as single releases. "The Invisible Man" is a cover of the Queen song, adding numerous ingredients not present in the original. Arguably the most popular song on the album is "U-Turn": a revamped version of "Hey You" which earlier appeared as the B-side to "Song of Scatland".

The album reached No. 45 in Switzerland. In Japan it reached No. 17 and remained in the Top 40 for 9 weeks, selling just under 100,000 copies, making it a minor success compared to Scatman's World, but still an accomplishment for a foreign artist.

Album history 
"Only You" was the third single from the "Scatman's World" album. While Europe got the "Song Of Scatland" single, this was the Japanese release in its place. "Popstar" was another track released as a CD promo in 1995 by Gramaphone Records. In October John prepared a new single called "Everybody Jam", inspired by Jazz, his love, and a tribute to his childhood idol Louis Armstrong. In a 1996 interview John explains why he was inspired by Louis:

"Louis was the first and strongest influence on my musical existence. There have been many masters of music, of soul, but for me Louis is the father of them all.”

The single was followed in November by the album with the same title.

Track listing

References

External links 

1996 albums
Scatman John albums
RCA Records albums